Bonita Gloria Granville Wrather (February 2, 1923 – October 11, 1988) was an American actress and producer.

The daughter of vaudevillians, Granville began her career on the stage at age three. She initially began as a child actress, making her film debut in Westward Passage (1932). She rose to prominence for her role in These Three (1936), which earned her an Academy Award nomination at age fourteen. Her prominence continued with the Nancy Drew film series, and roles in Now, Voyager (1942) and Hitler's Children (1943).

After marrying Jack Wrather in 1947, Granville transitioned into producing with her husband on series such as Lassie (1959–1973). She was appointed to the John F. Kennedy Center Board of Trustees by president Richard Nixon in 1972 and for another term by president Ronald Reagan in 1982.

In addition to her Oscar nomination, Granville received a star on the Hollywood Walk of Fame in 1960 for her contributions to the film industry. She and her husband were posthumously named Disney Legends in 2011.

Early life
Granville was born on February 2, 1923, in Manhattan, New York City, the daughter of Rosina (née Timponi; 1892–1984) and  Bernard Granville (1888–1936). Both of her parents were stage performers. She was raised Roman Catholic.

Career

1932–1941: Child actress 
She made her film debut at the age of nine in Westward Passage (1932), and appeared in a credited but nearly wordless supporting role as the young dancer Fanny Bridges in Cavalcade (1933), which won the Academy Award for Best Picture. Over the next few years, she played uncredited supporting roles in such films as Little Women (1933) and Anne of Green Gables (1934). She next played the role of Mary Tilford in the 1936 film adaptation of Lillian Hellman's 1934 stage play The Children's Hour. Renamed These Three, the film told the story of three adults (played by Miriam Hopkins, Merle Oberon, and Joel McCrea) who find their lives almost destroyed by the malicious lies of an evil, attention-seeking child. For her role as that child, Granville was nominated for an Academy Award for Best Supporting Actress, then the youngest person to be nominated for an Oscar.

In 1938, Granville was cast by Warner Bros. to play the role of girl detective Nancy Drew in a series of B movies based on the novels. The films were meant to resemble the popular Torchy Blane film series starring Glenda Farrell. Granville co-starred in the films with John Litel as her father Carson Drew, and Frankie Thomas, Jr. as Ted Nickerson. All four films — Nancy Drew... Detective (1938), Nancy Drew... Reporter (1939), Nancy Drew... Trouble Shooter (1939), and Nancy Drew and the Hidden Staircase (1939) — would play continuously in theaters over the next several years. Also in 1938, Granville appeared as the saucy, mischievous daughter in the multiple Academy Award-nominated hit comedy film Merrily We Live, and starred as the title character in The Beloved Brat. She also had Angels Wash Their Faces (1939) alongside Ronald Reagan, who would become a lifelong friend of hers.

In late 1939, Granville left Warner Bros. and signed a contract with MGM. However, she continued to be relegated to  supporting roles in The Mortal Storm (1940) and H. M. Pulham, Esq. (1941), and less substantial leading roles in Those Were the Days! (1940) and Down in San Diego (1941). She and MGM soon parted ways.

1942–1947: Stardom 
In 1941, Granville signed with RKO Pictures and immediately found more substantial supporting roles in The Glass Key (1942) and Now, Voyager (1942), for which she was loaned out to Paramount and Warner Bros. Following her leading role in Seven Miles from Alcatraz (1942), director Edward Dmytryk, soon cast her in RKO's World War II anti-Nazism film Hitler's Children (1943). The film was a commercial and critical success, becoming one of the studio's highest-grossing films of the year, and one of the highest-grossing for both RKO and 1943; it was also reportedly Granville's favorite film of hers. However, the studio relegated her to B-films such as Youth Runs Wild (1944) and The Truth About Murder (1946). She continued to be loaned out to other studios, such as MGM loaned for two Andy Hardy films with Mickey Rooney, Andy Hardy's Blonde Trouble (1944) and Love Laughs at Andy Hardy (1946), as well as a leading role in Song of the Open Road (1944); Universal for The Beautiful Cheat and Senorita from the West (both 1945); and United Artists for Breakfast in Hollywood. Following being loaned out to Monogram Pictures for Suspense (1946) and The Guilty (1947), Granville informally retired from films, only appearing in Strike It Rich (1948) and Guilty of Treason (1950).

1948–1988: Later career 
On February 5, 1947, Granville married Jack Wrather at the Bel-Air Hotel, having met him while he produced The Guilty. He formed the Wrather Corporation, and bought the rights to the characters from both The Lone Ranger and Lassie. Granville worked as a producer for several film and television productions featuring these characters, including the 1954 TV series Lassie.

She appeared in the film version of The Lone Ranger in 1956, and made her final screen appearance in a cameo role in The Legend of the Lone Ranger (1981). Their children are daughters Molly and Linda, and sons Jack and Christopher. Jack and Molly were from Wrather's previous marriage to Mollie O'Daniel, a daughter of Governor of Texas and U.S. Senator W. Lee O'Daniel. The marriage lasted until Wrather's death in 1984, shortly after release of the movie The Magic of Lassie, a movie co-produced by Granville and starring Wrather's friend James Stewart.

In 1949, she appeared with Rod Cameron in the comedy film Strike It Rich, filmed about Tyler, Kilgore, and Lindale in East Texas.

Death

Granville died on October 11, 1988, of lung cancer at Saint John's Health Center in Santa Monica, California, at the age of 65. She was buried at the Holy Cross Cemetery in Culver City, California.

Legacy
Granville has a star on the Hollywood Walk of Fame, at 6607 Hollywood Boulevard, for her contributions to motion pictures. She was honored at the Disneyland Hotel, which she and her husband owned until The Wrather Company was sold to the Walt Disney Company after Granville's death. The Bonita Tower and the Granville's Steak House were named in her honor. In 2011, Disney honored the Wrathers posthumously by inducting them into the Disney Legends.

In 1942, Granville's image was used as the heroine of the novel Bonita Granville and the Mystery of Star Island. The story, written by Kathryn Heisenfelt, was published by Whitman Publishing Company in 1942. The story was written for a young teenaged audience, and is reminiscent of the adventures of Nancy Drew. It is part of a series known as "Whitman Authorized Editions", 16 books published between 1941 and 1947 that featured a film actress as heroine.

Partial filmography
(As actress, unless otherwise specified)

 Westward Passage (1932) as Little Olivia Allen (age 10)
 Silver Dollar (1932) as Liddy (uncredited)
 Cavalcade (1933) as Young Fanny
 Beauty for Sale (1933) as Little Girl at Madame Sonia's (uncredited)
 Little Women (1933) as Amy's Classmate (uncredited)
 Cradle Song (1933) as Carmen
 The Life of Vergie Winters (1934) as Joan Winters as a Child (uncredited)
 Anne of Green Gables (1934) as School Girl (uncredited)
 Ah, Wilderness! (1935) as Mildred Miller
 Song of the Saddle (1936) as Jen as a Child
 These Three (1936) as Mary Tilford
 The Garden of Allah (1936) as Convent Girl (uncredited)
 The Plough and the Stars (1936) as Mollser
 Maid of Salem (1937) as Ann – Their Daughter
 Quality Street (1937) as Isabella (uncredited)
 Call It a Day (1937) as Ann Hilton
 It's Love I'm After (1937) as Gracie Kane
 White Banners (1938) as Sally Ward
 Merrily We Live (1938) as Marian Kilbourne
 The Beloved Brat (1938) as Roberta Morgan
 My Bill (1938) as Gwen Colbrook
 Hard to Get (1938) as Connie
 Nancy Drew... Detective (1938) as Nancy Drew
 Nancy Drew... Reporter (1939) as Nancy Drew
 Nancy Drew... Trouble Shooter (1939) as Nancy Drew
 The Angels Wash Their Faces (1939) as Peggy Finnegan
 Nancy Drew and the Hidden Staircase (1939) as Nancy Drew
 Forty Little Mothers (1940) as Doris
 Those Were the Days! (1940) as Martha Scroggs
 The Mortal Storm (1940) as Elsa
 Third Finger, Left Hand (1940) as Vicky Sherwood
 Escape (1940) as Ursula
 Gallant Sons (1940) as Kate Pendleton
 The Wild Man of Borneo (1941) as Francine Diamond
 The People vs. Dr. Kildare (1941) as Frances Marlowe
 Down in San Diego (1941) as Betty Haines
 H.M. Pulham, Esq. (1941) as Mary Pulham
 Syncopation (1942) as Kit Latimer
 The Glass Key (1942) as Opal Madvig
 Seven Miles from Alcatraz (1942) as Anne Porter
 Now, Voyager (1942) as June Vale
 Hitler's Children (1943) as Anna Müller
 Andy Hardy's Blonde Trouble (1944) as Kay Wilson
 Song of the Open Road (1944) as Bonnie
 Youth Runs Wild (1944) as Toddy Jones
 The Beautiful Cheat (1945) as Alice
 Senorita from the West (1945) as Jeannie Blake
 Breakfast in Hollywood (1946) as Dorothy Larson
 The Truth About Murder (1946) as Christine Allen
 Suspense (1946) as Ronnie
 Love Laughs at Andy Hardy (1946) as Kay Wilson
 The Guilty (1947) as Estelle Mitchell / Linda Mitchell
 Strike It Rich (1948) as Julie Ann Brady
 Guilty of Treason (1950) as Stephanie Varna
 The Lone Ranger (1956) as Welcome Kilgore
 The Magic of Lassie (1978, producer)
 The Legend of the Lone Ranger (1981) as Woman (uncredited) (final film role)

Radio appearances

References

Further reading

External links

 
 Nancy Drew – Movie Star at FilmBuffOnline
 

1923 births
1988 deaths
American child actresses
American film actresses
American Roman Catholics
Television producers from New York City
American women television producers
Deaths from lung cancer in California
Actresses from Chicago
Burials at Holy Cross Cemetery, Culver City
20th-century American actresses
Actresses from New York City
20th-century American businesspeople
20th-century American businesswomen
Television producers from Illinois